"Love Is Only a Feeling" is a song by British rock band the Darkness, released as the fifth and final single from their 2003 debut studio album, Permission to Land. The power ballad peaked at number five on the UK Singles Chart.

Music video
The music video for the song was filmed at locations around the Blue Mountains of Australia, including a flat rock mesa that, since 2013, is now called Lincoln's Rock in Wentworth Falls; the Devils Coachhouse, in Jenolan Caves; and Walls Lookout, off Bells Line of Road.

Track listings
 UK and Australian CD single
 "Love is Only a Feeling"
 "Planning Permission"
 "Curse of the Tollund Man"
 
 UK 7-inch single
A. "Love is Only a Feeling"
B. "Planning Permission"

 UK DVD single
 "Love is Only a Feeling" (video)
 "Behind the Scenes" (video)
 "Get Your Hands Off My Woman" (live at the Astoria video)

Credits and personnel
Credits are taken from the Permission to Land album booklet.

Studios
 Recorded at Chapel Studios (Lincolnshire, England)
 Additional vocals recorded at Paul Smith Music Studios (London, England)
 Mixed at Roundhouse Recording Studios (London, England)
 Mastered at The Exchange (London, England)

Personnel

 Justin Hawkins – writing, vocals, guitar, synthesizer, piano
 Dan Hawkins – writing, guitar
 Frankie Poullain – writing, bass
 Ed Graham – writing, drums
 Pedro Ferreira – production, mixing, engineering
 Will Bartle – recording assistant
 Nick Taylor – mixing assistant
 Mike Marsh – mastering

Charts

Release history

References

2000s ballads
2003 songs
2004 singles
Atlantic Records singles
The Darkness (band) songs
Rock ballads
Songs written by Dan Hawkins (musician)
Songs written by Ed Graham
Songs written by Frankie Poullain
Songs written by Justin Hawkins
UK Independent Singles Chart number-one singles